Sleepy Sweet is an EP by Pram, released on 3 August 1998 through Domino Records.

Track listing

Personnel 
Rosie Cuckston – vocals, keyboards, omnichord
Matt Eaton - guitar, bass guitar, sampler, keyboards
Sam Owen –  bass guitar, guitar, keyboards, accordion, woodwind
Max Simpson – keyboards, sampler
Nick Sales – keyboards, guitar, woodwind, theremin, sampler
Mark Butterworth – drums, percussion

References

External links 
 

1998 EPs
Domino Recording Company EPs
Pram (band) albums